Wiamoase is a town in the Sekyere South district, a district in the Ashanti Region of Ghana.

Education
Wiamoase is known for the Okomfo Anokye Secondary Secondary School.  The school is a second cycle institution.

Healthcare
The Seventh-Day Adventist Hospital is located in Wiamoase.

References

External links
 Wiamoase - Map

Populated places in the Ashanti Region